Sreten Atanasković (born 15 March 1995) is a Serbian footballer.

Club career
Born in Belgrade, Atanasković spent his youth career playing with several local club including Partizan, OFK Beograd, Teleoptik, Rad and BASK, where he also started his senior career in the Serbian League Belgrade. In 2014 he moved to Danish side Sydvest 05. During the winter break off-season, Atanasković returned to Serbian, joining Sloga Kraljevo. Later, same year, Atanasković also played with Sopot, and then he stayed as a member of Dolina Padina until the end of 2016. He was also on trial with NK Istra 1961 in summer same year. At the beginning of 2017, he joined Sloboda Užice.

After 5 months at FK IMT, Atanasković joined FK Trayal Kruševac in the summer 2018. He played a total of two league games for the club before he left a half year later. In 2019, he joined FK Borac Sakule.

References

External links
 
 

1995 births
Living people
Footballers from Belgrade
Association football midfielders
Serbian footballers
FK BASK players
FK Sopot players
FK Dolina Padina players
FK Sloga Kraljevo players
FK Sloboda Užice players
FK Smederevo players
FK Zlatibor Čajetina players
Serbian First League players
Serbian expatriate footballers
Serbian expatriate sportspeople in Denmark
Expatriate men's footballers in Denmark
FC Sydvest 05 players